Steve Hancock (born 10 September 1953) is an English former professional footballer who played as a forward.

Career
Born in Sheffield, Hancock played for Newtongrange Star, Celtic, Sheffield Wednesday, Hearts, Meadowbank Thistle Stenhousemuir and Forfar Athletic.

References

1953 births
Living people
English footballers
Newtongrange Star F.C. players
Celtic F.C. players
Sheffield Wednesday F.C. players
Heart of Midlothian F.C. players
Livingston F.C. players
Stenhousemuir F.C. players
Forfar Athletic F.C. players
Scottish Football League players
Association football forwards